Twice is a South Korean girl group.

Twice may also refer to:

Literature
 Twice (magazine), a consumer electronics trade magazine
 Twice (novel), a novel by Lisa Miscione

Music
 Twice (Hollie Cook album) (2014)
 Twice (The Tyde album) (2003)
 Twice, a 2009 EP by Yeti Lane
 "Twice", a 2015 song by Ludovico Einaudi and the Amsterdam Sinfonietta from Elements
 "Twice" (song), a 2018 song by Christina Aguilera
 "Twice", a 2016 song by Catfish and the Bottlemen from The Ride
 "Twice", a 2022 song by Charli XCX from Crash

Other uses
 Twice (online retailer), an American online marketplace
 Twice (My Hero Academia), a character in My Hero Academia

See also
 #Twice and &Twice, albums by Twice